Buġibba is a zone within St. Paul's Bay in the Northern Region, Malta. It is situated adjacent to Qawra, and it is a popular tourist resort, containing numerous hotels, restaurants, pubs, archit clubs, and a casino.

History
During the Tarxien phase of Maltese prehistory, a small temple was built in what is now Buġibba. The temple was excavated between the 1920s and 1950s, and it is now located in the grounds of a hotel.

In around 1715, the Order of St. John built Buġibba Battery as part of a series of fortifications defending Malta's coastline. Today, only remains of its foundations and ditch have survived.

In the 1960s, Buġibba began to see rapid development, and it is now a popular tourist resort. It is especially popular among students who go to Malta to learn English. The town's main highlight is the town's square, which is located along the promenade. The area is full of nightclubs, bars and restaurants.

References

Towns in Malta
St. Paul's Bay